Doran Expressway is the northern section of eastern part of Tehran ring road expressway network connecting Basij Expressway to Yasini Expressway.

Expressways in Tehran